Christianity in China has been present since at least the 1st century, and has gained a significant amount of influence during the last 200 years. 

The significant lack of evidence of Christianity's existence in China between the 3rd century and the 7th century can likely be attributed to the barriers placed in Persia by the Sassanids and the closure of the trade route in Turkestan. 

Both events prevented Christians from staying in contact with their mother church, the Syriac Antiochian Church, thereby halting the spread of Christianity until the reign of emperor T'sai-tsung, or Taizong (627-649). Taizong, who had studied the Christian Scriptures which were given to him by the Assyrian missionary Alopen, realized "their propriety and truth and specifically ordered their preaching and transmission."

The Syro-Persian Church of the East (frequently mischaracterized as Nestorianism) appeared in China in the 7th century, during the Tang dynasty. Catholicism was one of the religions patronized by the emperors of the Mongol-led Yuan dynasty, but it did not take root in China until it was reintroduced by Jesuit missionaries in the 16th century. Beginning in the early nineteenth century, Protestant missionaries attracted small but influential followings, and independent Chinese churches were also established.

It is estimated that Christianity is the fastest growing religion in China. There were some four million before 1949 (three million Catholics and one million Protestants). Accurate data on Chinese Christians is difficult to access.

In the early 2000s, there were approximately 38 million Protestants and 10-12 million Catholics, with a smaller number of Evangelical and Orthodox Christians. The number of Chinese Christians had increased significantly since the easing of restrictions on religious activities during the economic reforms of the late 1970s. In 2018, the Chinese government declared that there are over 44 million Christians in China. On the other hand, some international Christian organizations estimate that there are tens of millions more, who choose not to publicly identify as such. These estimations are controversial because the organizations which make them are often accused of deliberately inflating them.

The practice of religion was tightly controlled in dynastic times and it is also tightly controlled today. Chinese who are over the age of 18 are only permitted to join officially sanctioned Christian groups which are registered with the government-sanctioned Catholic Patriotic Church, the China Christian Council and the Protestant Three-Self Church. On the other hand, many Christians who practice Christianity are members of informal networks and unregistered congregations, these congregations are frequently described as house churches or underground churches, the proliferation of which began in the 1950s when many Chinese Protestants and Catholics rejected the state-controlled structures which were purported to represent them. Members of such groups are said to represent the "silent majority" of Chinese Christians and they also represent many diverse theological traditions.

Terminology 

There are various terms which are used for God in the Chinese language, the most prevalent of them is Shangdi (literally, the "Highest Emperor"), commonly used by both Protestants and non-Christians, and Tianzhu (literally, the "Lord of Heaven"), which is most commonly used by Catholics. Shen, which is also widely used by Chinese Protestants, defines the gods or the generative powers of nature in Chinese traditional religions. Historically, Christians have also adopted a variety of terms from the Chinese classics as references to God, for example, the Ruler and the Creator.

Terms for Christianity in Chinese include: "Protestantism"; "Catholicism"; and Eastern Orthodox Christians. The whole of Orthodox Christianity is named Zhèng jiào. Christians in China are referred to as "Christ followers/believers" or "Christ religion followers/believers".

History

Pre-modern history

Han dynasty art 
There have been significant discoveries made about Han dynasty artistic trends regarding Christianity. Some pieces of art dating from 86 AD at the latest had figures drawn in a clearly Middle Eastern style that depicted Biblical stories, although many scholars have disputed Christians entering China during this time.

Earliest documented period

The Christian apologist Arnobius (died c. AD 330) claimed in his work Against the Heathen: Book II, that Christianity had reached the land of Seres (an old Roman name for northern China). However, to date, there is little to no archaeological evidence or knowledge about the pre-Church of the East classical Chinese and/or Tocharian church.

Two (possibly Church of the East) monks were preaching Christianity in India in the 6th century before they smuggled silkworm eggs from China to the Byzantine Empire.

The first documentation of Christianity entering China was written on an 8th-century stone tablet known as the Xi'an Stele. It records that Christians reached the Tang dynasty capital Xi'an in 635 and were allowed to establish places of worship and to propagate their faith. The leader of the Christian travelers was Alopen, and his meeting with Emperor Taizong was the most influential development in Chinese Christian history yet, leading to the spread of the religion to a much greater extent than ever before.

Some modern scholars question whether Nestorianism is the proper term for the Christianity that was practiced in China, since it did not adhere to what was preached by Nestorius. They instead prefer to refer to it as "Church of the East", a term which encompasses the various forms of early Christianity in Asia.

Despite Tang Dynasty historians typically getting some elements of Christian history and doctrine wrong in their writing, there was a significant community of scholars who translated the Old and New Testaments into Chinese and understood them fully.

In 845, at the height of the Great Anti-Buddhist Persecution, the Emperor Wuzong of Tang decreed that Buddhism, Christianity, and Zoroastrianism be banned, and their very considerable assets forfeited to the state.

In 986 a monk reported to the Patriarch of the East:
Christianity is extinct in China; the native Christians have perished in one way or another; the church has been destroyed and there is only one Christian left in the land.

Karel Pieters noted that some Christian gravestones are dated from the Song and Liao dynasties (ca. 900s to 1200s), implying that some Christians remained in China in these eras.

Medieval period

Christianity was a major influence in the Mongol Empire, as several Mongol tribes were primarily Church of the East Christian, and many of the wives of Genghis Khan's descendants were Christian. Contacts with Western Christianity also came in this time period, via envoys from the Papacy to the capital of the Yuan dynasty in Khanbaliq (present-day Beijing).

Church of the East Christianity was well established in China, as is attested by the monks Rabban Bar Sauma and Rabban Marcos, both of whom made a famous pilgrimage to the West, visiting many Church of the East communities along the way. Marcos was elected as Patriarch of the Church of the East, and Bar Sauma went as far as visiting the courts of Europe in 1287–1288, where he told Western monarchs about Christianity among the Mongols.

In 1294, Franciscan friars from Europe initiated mission work in China. For about a century they worked in parallel with the Church of the East Christians. The Franciscan mission disappeared from 1368, as the Ming dynasty set out to eject all foreign influences.

The Chinese called Muslims, Jews, and Christians in ancient times by the same name, "Hui Hui" (Hwuy-hwuy). Christians were called "Hwuy who abstain from animals without the cloven foot", Muslims were called "Hwuy who abstain from pork", Jews were called "Hwuy who extract the sinews". "Hwuy-tsze" (Hui zi) or "Hwuy-hwuy" (Hui Hui) is presently used almost exclusively for Muslims, but Jews were still called "Lan Maou Hwuy tsze" (Lan Mao Hui zi) which means "Blue-cap Hui zi". At Kaifeng, Jews were called "Teaou-kin-keaou", "extract-sinew religion". Jews and Muslims in China shared the same name for synagogue and mosque, which were both called "Tsing-chin sze" (Qingzhen si), "temple of purity and truth", the name dated to the thirteenth century. The synagogue and mosques were also known as "Le-pae sze" (Libai si). A tablet indicated that Judaism was once known as "Yih-tsze-lo-nee-keaou" (Israelitish religion) and synagogues known as "Yih-tsze lo née leen" (Israelitish temple), but it faded out of use.

It was also reported that competition with the Roman Catholic Church and Islam were also factors in causing Church of the East Christianity to disappear in China; the Roman Catholics also considered the Church of the East as heretical, speaking of "controversies with the emissaries of … Rome, and the progress of Mohammedanism, sapped the foundations of their ancient churches."

The Ming dynasty decreed that Manichaeism and Christianity were illegal and heterodox, to be wiped out from China, while Islam and Judaism were legal and fit Confucian ideology. Buddhist sects like the White Lotus were also banned by the Ming.

Jesuit missions in China 

By the 16th century, there is no reliable information about any practicing Christians remaining in China. Fairly soon after the establishment of the direct European maritime contact with China (1513) and the creation of the Society of Jesus (1540), at least some Chinese become involved with the Jesuit effort. As early as 1546, two Chinese boys became enrolled into the Jesuits' St. Paul's College in Goa, the capital of Portuguese India. Antonio, one of these two Christian Chinese, accompanied St. Francis Xavier, co-founder of the Jesuits, when he decided to start missionary work in China. However, Xavier was not able to find a way to enter the Chinese mainland and died in 1552 on Shangchuan Island off the coast of Guangdong.

With the Portuguese establishing an enclave on Zhongshan Island's Macau Peninsula, Jesuits established a base nearby on Green Island (now the SAR's "Ilha Verde" neighborhood). Alessandro Valignano, the new regional manager ("Visitor") of the order, came to Macau in 1578–1579 and established St. Paul's College to begin training the missionaries in the language and culture of the Chinese. He requested assistance from the orders' members in Goa in bringing over suitably talented linguists to staff the college and begin the mission in earnest.

In 1582, Jesuits once again initiated mission work inside China, introducing Western science, mathematics, astronomy, and cartography. Missionaries such as Matteo Ricci and Johann Adam Schall von Bell wrote Chinese catechisms and made influential converts like Xu Guangqi, establishing Christian settlements throughout the country and becoming close to the imperial court, particularly its Ministry of Rites, which oversaw official astronomy and astrology. Ricci and others including Michele Ruggieri, Philippe Couplet, and François Noël undertook a century-long effort in translating the Chinese classics into Latin and spreading knowledge of Chinese culture and history in Europe, influencing its developing Enlightenment.
The Jesuits also promoted phenomena of artistic hybridization in China, such as Chinese Christian cloisonné productions.

The introduction of the Franciscans (the first round of Catholic Church clergy to have come during this era) and other orders of missionaries, however, led to a long-running controversy over Chinese customs and names for God. The Jesuits, the secularized mandarins, and eventually the Kangxi Emperor himself maintained that Chinese veneration of ancestors and Confucius were respectful but nonreligious rituals compatible with Christian doctrine; other orders pointed to the beliefs of the common people of China to show that it was impermissible idolatry and that the common Chinese names for God confused the Creator with His creation. Acting on the complaint of the Bishop of Fujian,  finally ended the dispute with a decisive ban in 1704; his legate Charles-Thomas Maillard De Tournon issued summary and automatic excommunication of any Christian permitting Confucian rituals as soon as word reached him in 1707. By that time, however, Tournon and Bishop Maigrot had displayed such extreme ignorance in questioning before the throne that the Kangxi Emperor mandated the expulsion of Christian missionaries unable to abide by the terms of Ricci's Chinese catechism. Tournon's policies, confirmed by Clement's 1715 bull Ex Illa Die..., led to the swift collapse of all of the missions across China, with the last Jesuits—obliged to maintain allegiance to the papal rulings—finally being expelled after 1721. It was not until 1939 that the Catholic Church revisited its stance, with Pope Pius XII permitting some forms of Chinese customs; Vatican II later confirmed the new policy.

17th to 18th centuries
Further waves of missionaries came to China in the Qing (or Manchu) dynasty (1644–1911) as a result of contact with foreign powers. Russian Orthodoxy was introduced in 1715 and Protestants began entering China in 1807.

The Qing dynasty's Yongzheng Emperor was firmly against Christian converts among his own Manchu people. He warned them that the Manchus must follow only the Manchu way of worshipping Heaven since different peoples worshipped Heaven differently. He stated:
The Lord of Heaven is Heaven itself. . . . In the empire we have a temple for honoring Heaven and sacrificing to Him. We Manchus have Tiao Tchin. The first day of every year we burn incense and paper to honor Heaven. We Manchus have our own particular rites for honoring Heaven; the Mongols, Chinese, Russians, and Europeans also have their own particular rites for honoring Heaven. I have never said that he [Urcen, a son of Sun] could not honor heaven but that everyone has his way of doing it. As a Manchu, Urcen should do it like us.

19th to 20th centuries

By the 1840s China became a major destination for Protestant missionaries from Europe and the United States. Catholic missionaries, who had been banned for a time, returned a few decades later. It is difficult to determine an exact number, but historian Kathleen Lodwick estimates that some 50,000 foreigners served in mission work in China between 1809 and 1949, including both Protestants and Catholics.  They encountered significant opposition from local elites, who were committed to Confucianism and resented Western ethical systems.  Missionaries were often seen as part of Western imperialism. The educated gentry were afraid for their own power. The mandarins claim to power lay in the knowledge of the Chinese classics—all government officials had to pass extremely difficult tests on Confucianism. The elite currently in power feared this might be replaced by the Bible, scientific training and Western education. Indeed, the examination system was abolished in the early 20th century by reformers who admired Western models of modernization.

The main goal was conversions, but they made relatively few. They were much more successful in setting up schools, as well as hospitals and dispensaries. They avoided Chinese politics, but were committed opponents of opium. Western governments could protect them in the treaty ports, but outside those limited areas they were at the mercy of local government officials and threats were common. They were a prime target of attack and murder by Boxers in 1900.

Protestant missions

140 years of Protestant missionary work began with Robert Morrison, arriving in Macau on 4 September 1807. Morrison produced a Chinese translation of the Bible. He also compiled a Chinese dictionary for the use of Westerners. The Bible translation took 12 years and the compilation of the dictionary, 16 years.

Hostile laws
The Qing government code included a prohibition of "Wizards, Witches, and all Superstitions". The Jiaqing Emperor, in 1814, added a sixth clause with reference to Christianity, modified in 1821 and printed in 1826 by the Daoguang Emperor prohibiting those who spread Christianity among Han Chinese and Manchus. Christians who would not renounce their conversion were to be sent to Muslim cities in Xinjiang, to be given as slaves to Muslim leaders and beys. Some hoped that the Chinese government would discriminate between Protestantism and the Catholic Church, since the law was directed at Rome, but after Protestant missionaries in 1835– 36 gave Christian books to Chinese, the Daoguang Emperor demanded to know who were the "traitorous natives in Canton who had supplied them with books".

Rapid growth after 1842
The pace of missionary activity increased considerably after the First Opium War in 1842. Christian missionaries and their schools, under the protection of the Western powers, went on to play a major role in the Westernization of China in the 19th and 20th centuries. Liang Fa ("Leung Faat" in Cantonese) worked in a printing company in Guangzhou in 1810 and came to know Robert Morrison, who translated the Bible to Chinese and needed printing of the translation. When William Milne arrived at Guangzhou in 1813 and worked with Morrison on translation of the Bible, he also came to know Liang, whom he baptized in 1816. In 1827, Liang was ordained by Morrison, thus, he became a missionary for the London Missionary Society and the first Chinese Protestant minister and evangelist.

During the 1840s, Western missionaries promulgated Christianity in officially designated coastal Treaty ports that were open to foreign trade. The Taiping Rebellion (1850-1864) originated in the influence of missionaries on its leader Hong Xiuquan, who called himself the younger brother of Jesus Christ, but he was denounced as a heretic by mainstream Christian groups. Hong's revolt against the Qing government lead to the establishment of the Heavenly Kingdom of Great Peace, and its capital was established at Nanjing. Hong attained control of significant parts of southern China, at its height, the Taiping Heavenly Kingdom ruled around 30 million people. Hong's theocratic and militaristic regime instituted social reforms which included the strict separation of the sexes, the abolition of foot binding, land socialization, the suppression of private trade, and the replacement of Confucianism, Buddhism and Chinese folk religion with Hong's version of Christianity. The Taiping rebellion was eventually put down by the Qing army, which was aided by French and British forces. With an estimated death toll of between 20 and 30 million due to warfare and the resulting starvation, this civil war is considered one of history's deadliest conflicts. Sun Yat-sen and Mao Zedong viewed the Taiping as heroic revolutionaries who fought against a corrupt feudal system.

Hospitals and schools
Christians established clinics and hospitals, and provided training for nurses. Both Roman Catholics and Protestants founded educational institutions from the primary to the university level. Some prominent Chinese universities began as religious-founded institutions. Missionaries worked to abolish practices such as foot binding, and the unjust treatment of maidservants, as well as launching charitable work and distributing food to the poor. They also opposed the opium trade and brought treatment to many who were addicted.

Some early leaders of the Chinese Republic, such as Sun Yat-sen were converts to Christianity and were influenced by its teachings.

Expanding beyond the port cities

By the early 1860s the Taiping movement was almost extinct, Protestant missions at the time were confined to five coastal cities. By the end of the century, however, the picture had vastly changed. Scores of new missionary societies had been organized, and several thousand missionaries were working in all parts of China. This transformation can be traced to the Unequal Treaties which forced the Chinese government to admit Western missionaries into the interior of the country, the excitement caused by the 1859 awakening of faith in Britain. A major role was played by J. Hudson Taylor (1832–1905). Taylor (Plymouth Brethren) arrived in China in 1854. Historian Kenneth Scott Latourette wrote that Hudson Taylor was "one of the greatest missionaries of all time, and ... one of the four or five most influential foreigners who came to China in the nineteenth century for any purpose."

The China Inland Mission, based in London with a strong appeal to fundamentalist and evangelical Anglicans, was the largest mission agency in China and it is estimated that Taylor was responsible for more people being converted to Christianity than at any other time since The days of the apostles. Out of the 8,500 Protestant missionaries that were at one time at work in China, 1000 of them were from the China Inland Mission. Dixon Edward Hoste, the successor to Hudson Taylor, originally expressed the self-governing principles of the Three-Self Church, at the time he was articulating the goal of the China Inland Mission to establish an indigenous Chinese Church that was free from foreign control.

Social services
In imperial-times Chinese social and religious culture there were charitable organizations for virtually every social service: burial of the dead, care of orphans, provision of food for the hungry. The wealthiest in every community—typically, the merchants—were expected to give food, medicine, clothing, and even cash to those in need. According to Caroline Reeves, a historian at Emmanuel College in Boston, that began to change with the arrival of American missionaries in the late 19th century. One of the reasons they gave for being there was to help the poor Chinese.

By 1865 when the China Inland Mission began, there were already thirty different Protestant groups at work in China, however the diversity of denominations represented did not equate to more missionaries on the field. In the seven provinces in which Protestant missionaries had already been working, there were an estimated 204 million people with only 91 workers, while there were eleven other provinces in inland China with a population estimated at 197 million, for whom absolutely nothing had been attempted. Besides the London Missionary Society, and the American Board of Commissioners for Foreign Missions, there were missionaries affiliated with Baptists, Presbyterians, Methodists, Episcopalians, and Wesleyans. Most missionaries came from England, the United States, Sweden, France, Germany, Switzerland, or the Netherlands.

Secular books
In addition to the publication and distribution of Christian literature and Bibles, the Protestant missionary movement in China furthered the dispersion of knowledge with other printed works of history and science. As the missionaries went to work among the Chinese, they established and developed schools and introduced medical techniques from the West. The mission schools were viewed with some suspicion by the traditional Chinese teachers, but they differed from the norm by offering a basic education to poor Chinese, both boys and girls, who had no hope of learning at a school before the days of the Chinese Republic.

Opposition
Local affairs in China were under the control of local officials and the land-owning gentry. They led the opposition to missionary work.  According to historian Paul Varg:
The Chinese hostility to the missionary was based first of all on the fact that Western Christianity was utterly strange and incomprehensible to the Chinese. There was also the opposition based on what they did understand, namely the missionary's revolutionary program. The literati sensed from the very beginning that Christianization would deprive them of their power. So intense was their hostility that few missionaries considered it worthwhile to make any effort to win them over.

In December 1897, Wilhelm II declared his intent to seize territory in China, which triggered a "scramble for concessions" by which Britain, France, Russia and Japan also secured their own sphere of influence in China. After the German government took over Shandong, many Chinese feared that the foreign missionaries and possibly all Christian activities were imperialist attempts at "carving the melon", i.e., to colonize China piece by piece.

Local gentry published hate literature against the foreign missionaries. One tract featured foreign missionaries praying to crucified pigs—the Catholic term for God was Tianzhu (Heavenly Lord), in which the Chinese character "zhu" had the same pronunciation as the word for "pig".  The pamphlet also showed Christian clergy engaging in orgies following Sunday services and removing the placentas, breasts, and testicles from kidnapped Chinese. It concluded with repeated calls for their extermination by vigilantes and the government.

The Boxer Uprising was in large part a reaction against Christianity in China. Missionaries were harassed and murdered, along with tens of thousands of converts. In 1895, the Manchu Yuxian, a magistrate in the province, acquired the help of the Big Swords Society in fighting against bandits. The Big Swords practiced heterodox practices, however, they were not bandits and were not seen as bandits by Chinese authorities. The Big Swords relentlessly crushed the bandits, but the bandits converted to the Catholic Church, because it made them legally immune to prosecution under the protection of the foreigners. The Big Swords proceeded to attack the bandits' Catholic churches and burn them. Yuxian only executed several Big Sword leaders, but did not punish anyone else. More secret societies started emerging after this.

In Pingyuan, the site of another insurrection and major religious disputes, the county magistrate noted that Chinese converts to Christianity were taking advantage of their bishop's power to file false lawsuits which, upon investigation, were found groundless.

French Catholic missionaries were active in China; they were funded by appeals in French churches for money.  The Holy Childhood Association (L'Oeuvre de la Sainte Enfance) was a Catholic charity founded in 1843 to rescue Chinese children from infanticide. It was a target of Chinese anti-Christian protests notably in the Tianjin Massacre of 1870. Rioting sparked by false rumors of the killing of babies led to the death of a French consul and provoked a diplomatic crisis.

Popularity and indigenous growth (1900–1925)

Many scholars see the historical period between the Boxer Uprising and the Second Sino-Japanese War as a golden age of Chinese Christianity, as converts grew rapidly and churches were built in many regions of China. Paul Varg argues that American missionaries worked very hard on changing China:
  The growth of the missionary movement in the first decades of the [20th] century wove a tie between the American church-going public and China that did not exist between the United States and any other country. The number of missionaries increased from 513 in 1890 to more than 2,000 in 1914, and by 1920 there were 8,325 Protestant missionaries in China. In 1927 there were sixteen American universities and colleges, ten professional schools of collegiate rank, four schools of theology, and six schools of medicine. These institutions represented an investment of $19 million.  By 1920, 265 Christian middle schools existed with an enrollment of 15,213. There were thousands of elementary schools; the Presbyterians alone had 383 primary schools with about 15,000 students.
Extensive fund-raising and publicity campaigns were held across the U.S. The Catholics in the United States also supported large mission operations in China.

Following the 1910 World Missionary Conference in Glasgow, Protestant missionaries energetically promoted what they called "indigenization", that is assigning the leadership of churches to local Christian leaders. The Chinese National YMCA was the first to do so. In the 1920s, a group of church leaders formed the National Christian Council to coordinate interdenominational activity. Among the leaders were Cheng Jingyi, who was influential at the Glasgow Conference with his call for a non-denominational church. The way was prepared for the creation of the Church of Christ in China, a unified non-denominational church.

After World War I, the New Culture Movement fostered an intellectual atmosphere that promoted Science and Democracy. Although some of the movement's leaders, such as Chen Duxiu, initially expressed admiration for the role that Christianity played in building the strong nations of the West, as well as approving the emphasis on love and social service, Christianity became identified in the eyes of many young Chinese with foreign control of China. The 1923 Anti-Christian Movement attacked missionaries and their followers on the grounds that no religion was scientific and that the Christian church in China was a tool of the foreigners. Such Chinese Protestants as the liberals David Z. T. Yui, head of the Chinese National YMCA, and Y. T. Wu (Wu Yaozong), Wu Leichuan, T. C. Chao, and the theologically more conservative Chen Chonggui responded by developing social programs and theologies that devoted themselves to strengthening the Chinese nation. Y. C. James Yen, a graduate of Yale University, led a program of village reform.

Several political leaders of the Republican period were Protestant Christians, including Sun Yat-sen, Chiang Kai-shek, Feng Yuxiang, and Wang Zhengting. Leading writers include Lin Yutang, who renounced his Christianity for several decades. His journey of faith from Christianity to Taoism and Buddhism, and back to Christianity in his later life was recorded in his book From Pagan to Christian (1959).
Lottie Moon (1840-1912), representing the Southern Baptist, was the most prominent woman missionary. Although an equality-oriented feminist who rejected male dominance, the Southern Baptists have memorialized her as a southern belle who followed traditional gender roles.

Medical missions
Medical missions in China by the late 19th century laid the foundations for modern medicine in China. Western medical missionaries established the first modern clinics and hospitals, provided the first training for nurses, and opened the first medical schools in China. By 1901, China was the most popular destination for medical missionaries. The 150 foreign physicians operated 128 hospitals and 245 dispensaries, treating 1.7 million patients. In 1894, male medical missionaries constituted 14 percent of all missionaries; women doctors were four percent. Modern medical education in China started in the early 20th century at hospitals run by international missionaries. They began establishing nurse training schools in China in the late 1880s, but nursing of sick men by female nurses was rejected by local traditions, so the number of Chinese students was small until the practice became accepted in the 1930s. There was also a level of distrust on the part of traditional evangelical missionaries who thought hospitals were diverting needed resources away from the primary goal of conversions.

Of the 500 hospitals in China in 1931, 235 were run by Protestant missions and 10 by Catholic missions. The mission hospitals produce 61 percent of Western trained doctors, 32 percent nurses and 50 percent of medical schools. Already by 1923 China had half of the world's missionary hospital beds and half the world's missionary doctors.

Due to the essential non-existence of Chinese doctors of Western medicine in China and Hong Kong, the founding of colleges of Western medicine was an important part of the medical mission.  These colleges for the training of male and female doctors were separately founded. The training of female doctors was particularly necessary, due to the reluctance of Chinese women to see male doctors.

The Hong Kong College of Medicine for Chinese (香港華人西醫書院) was founded in Hong Kong by the London Missionary Society in 1887 for the training of male doctors. Sun Yat-Sen, the first graduate of this college and the founder of modern China, graduated in 1892. Hong Kui Wong  (黄康衢) (1876-1961) graduated in 1900 and then moved to Singapore, where he supported the Chinese Revolution led by Sun Yat-Sen.

The Hackett Medical College for Women (夏葛女子醫學院), the first medical college for women in China, and its affiliated hospital known as David Gregg Hospital for Women and Children (柔濟醫院), located together in Guangzhou, China, were founded by female medical missionary Mary H. Fulton (1854-1927). Fulton was sent by the Foreign Missions Board of the Presbyterian Church (USA), with the support of the Lafayette Avenue Presbyterian Church of Brooklyn, New York, of which David Gregg was pastor. The college was dedicated in 1902 and offered a four-year medical curriculum. Its graduates include Lee Sun Chau.

Indigenous Christian leaders
Indigenous Christian evangelism started in China in the late 1800s. Man-Kai Wan (1869–1927) was one of the first Chinese doctors of Western medicine in Hong Kong, the inaugural chairman of the Hong Kong Chinese Medical Association (1920–1922, forerunner of the Hong Kong Medical Association), and a secondary school classmate of Sun Yat-sen in the Government Central College (currently known as Queen's College) in Hong Kong. Wan and Sun graduated from secondary school around 1886. Doctor Wan was also the chairman of the board of a Christian newspaper called Great Light Newspaper (大光報) that was distributed in Hong Kong and China. Sun and Wan practiced Western Medicine together in a joint clinic. The father-in-law of Wan was Au Fung-Chi (1847–1914), the secretary of the Hong Kong Department of Chinese Affairs, manager of Kwong Wah Hospital for its 1911 opening, and an elder of To Tsai Church (renamed Hop Yat Church since 1926), which was founded by the London Missionary Society in 1888 and was the church of Sun Yat-sen.

National and social change: the war against Japan and the Chinese Civil War (1925–1949)

During World War II, China was devastated by the Second Sino-Japanese War which countered a Japanese invasion, and by the Chinese Civil War which resulted in the separation of Taiwan from mainland China. In this period the Chinese Christian churches and organizations had their first experience with autonomy from the Western structures of the missionary church organizations. Some scholars suggest this helped lay the foundation for the independent denominations and churches of the post-war period and the eventual development of the Three-Self Church and the Catholic Patriotic Church. At the same time the intense war period hampered the rebuilding and development of the churches.

Since 1949: The People's Republic 

The People's Republic of China (PRC) was declared October 1, 1949 by the Chinese Communist Party (CCP) led by Mao Zedong, while the Republic of China led by the Kuomintang maintained its government on the island of Taiwan. The historian Daniel Bays comments that it was "not surprising that this new government, like the emperors of several dynasties of the last millennium, evinced an insistence on monitoring religious life and requiring all religions, for example, to register their venues and leadership personnel with a government office."  Christian missionaries left in what was described by Phyllis Thompson of the China Inland Mission as a "reluctant exodus". 

The Chinese Protestant church entered the communist era having made significant progress toward self-support and self-government. While the Chinese Communist Party was hostile to religion in general, it did not seek to systematically destroy religion as long as the religious organizations were willing to submit to the direction of the Chinese state. Many Protestants were willing to accept such accommodation and were permitted to continue religious life in China under the name "Three-Self Patriotic Movement". Catholics, on the other hand, with their allegiance to the Holy See, could not submit to the Chinese state as their Protestant counterparts did, notwithstanding the willingness of the Vatican to compromise in order to remain on Chinese mainland—the papal nuncio in China did not withdraw to Taiwan like other western diplomats. Consequently, the Chinese state organized the Catholic Patriotic Church that operates without connection to the Vatican, and the Catholics who continued to acknowledge the authority of the Pope were subject to persecution.

From 1966 to 1976 during the Cultural Revolution, the expression of religious life in China was effectively banned, including even the Three-Self Church. During the ten-year period the government began to crackdown and persecute all religions. This forced the Christians to be secretive and go underground to avoid getting executed by the communist government. Religions in China began to recover after the economic reforms of the 1970s. In 1979 the government officially restored the Three-Self Church after thirteen years of non-existence, and in 1980 the China Christian Council (CCC) was formed.

Since then, persecution of Christians in China has been sporadic. During the Cultural Revolution believers were arrested and imprisoned and sometimes tortured for their faith. Bibles were destroyed, churches and homes were looted, and Christians were subjected to humiliation. Several thousand Christians were known to have been imprisoned between 1983 and 1993. In 1992 the government began a campaign to shut down all of the unregistered meetings. However, government implementation of restrictions since then has varied widely between regions of China and in many areas there is greater religious liberty.

The members of the underground Roman Catholic Church in China, those who do not belong to the official Catholic Patriotic Church and are faithful to the Vatican and the Pope, remain theoretically subject to persecution today. In practice, however, the Vatican and the Chinese State have been, at least unofficially, accommodating each other for some time. While some bishops who joined the Catholic Patriotic Church in its early years have been condemned and even excommunicated, the entire organization has never been declared schismatic by the Vatican and, at present, its bishops are even invited to church synods like other Catholic leaders. Also, many underground clergy and laymen are active in the official Patriotic Church as well. Still, there are periods of discomfort between Vatican and the Patriotic Church: Pope Benedict XVI condemned the Patriotic Catholic leaders as "persons who are not ordained, and sometimes not even baptised", who "control and make decisions concerning important ecclesial questions, including the appointment of bishops". The Chinese state indeed continues to appoint bishops and intervene in the church's policy (most notably on abortion and artificial contraception) without consulting the Vatican and punishing outspoken dissenters. In one notable case that drew international attention, Thaddeus Ma Daqin, the auxiliary bishop of Shanghai whom both the Vatican and Chinese state agreed as the successor to the elderly Aloysius Jin Luxian, the Patriotic Catholic bishop of Shanghai (whom the Vatican also recognized as the coadjutor bishop), was arrested and imprisoned after publicly resigning from his positions in the Patriotic Church in 2012, an act which was considered a challenge to the state control over the Catholic Church in China.

A Christian spiritual revival has grown in the first decades of the twenty-first century. The Communist Party remains officially atheist, and has remained intolerant of churches outside party control. Christianity has grown rapidly, reaching 67 million people. In recent years, however, the Communist Party has looked with distrust on organizations with international ties; it tends to associate Christianity with what it deems to be subversive Western values, and has closed churches and schools. In 2015, outspoken pastors in Hong Kong and their associates on the mainland came under close scrutiny from government officials.

Contemporary People's Republic of China

Subdivision of the Christian community

Official organizations—the Chinese Patriotic Catholic Church and the Chinese Protestant Church

The Catholic Patriotic Church and the Protestant Three-Self Patriotic Movement are centralised and government-sanctioned Christian institutions which regulate all local Christian gatherings, all of which are required to be registered under their auspices.

Unregistered churches

Many Christians hold meetings outside of the jurisdiction of the government-approved organizations and avoid registration with the government and are often illegal. While there has been continuous persecution of Chinese Christians throughout the twentieth century, particularly during the Cultural Revolution, there has been increasing tolerance of unregistered churches since the late 1970s.

Catholic groups are usually known as underground churches and Protestant groups are usually known as house churches. The Catholic underground churches are those congregations who remain fully faithful to the Pope in Rome and refuse to register as part of the Catholic Patriotic Church. Much of the Protestant house church movement dates back to the coerced unification of all Protestant denominations in the Three-Self Church in 1958. There is often significant overlap between the membership of registered and unregistered Christian bodies, as a large number of people attend both registered and unregistered churches.

Local authorities continued to harass and detain bishops, including Guo Xijin and Cui Tai, who refused to join the state-affiliated Catholic association. Chinese authorities raided or closed down hundreds of Protestant house churches in 2019, including Rock Church in Henan Province and Shouwang Church and Zion Church in Beijing, with their pastor, Jin Tianming and Jin Mingri under house arrest. The government released some of the Early Rain Covenant Church congregants who had been arrested in December 2018, but in December 2019 a court charged Pastor Wang Yi with “subversion of state power” and sentenced him to nine years imprisonment. Several local governments, including Guangzho city, offered cash bounties for individuals who informed on underground churches. In addition, authorities across the country have removed crosses from churches, banned youth under the age of 18 from participating in religious services, and replaced images of Jesus Christ or the Virgin Mary with pictures of Chinese Communist Party general secretary Xi Jinping.

Chinese Independent Churches

The Chinese Independent Churches are a group of Christian institutions that are independent from Western denominations. They were established in China in the late 19th and early 20th century, including both the Little Flock or Church Assembly Hall and True Jesus Church. In the 1940s they gathered 200,000 adherents, which was 20% to 25% of the total Christian population of that time.

Miller (2006) explains that a significant amount of the house churches or unregistered congregations and meeting points of the Protestant spectrum, that refuse to join the Three-Self Church—China Christian Council, belong to the Chinese Independent Churches. Congregations of the Little Flock or the True Jesus Church tend to be uncooperative towards the Three-Self Church as to their principle it represents not only a tool of the government but also a different Christian tradition.

Chinese Orthodox Church

There are a small number of adherents of Russian Orthodoxy in northern China, predominantly in Harbin. The first mission was undertaken by Russians in the 17th century. Orthodox Christianity is also practiced by the small Russian ethnic minority in China. The Church operates relatively freely in Hong Kong (where the Ecumenical Patriarch has sent a metropolitan, Bishop Nikitas and the Russian Orthodox parish of St Peter and St Paul resumed its operation) and Taiwan (where archimandrite Jonah George Mourtos leads a mission church).

Korean Christianity
Chinese scholars of religion have reported that a large portion of the members of the networks of house or unregistered churches, and of their pastors, belong to the Koreans of China. The pastors of the Shouwang Church and Zion Church, independent churches in Beijing noted for having been prosecuted by the government, are Chinese of Korean ethinicity. The Korean-Chinese pastors have a disproportional influence on the underground Christianity in China. Christianity has been an influential religion among the Korean people since the 19th century, and it has become the largest religion in South Korea after the division from the north in 1945. Christianity also has a strong presence in the Yanbian Korean Autonomous Prefecture, in the Jilin province of China.

The Christianity of Yanbian Koreans has a patriarchal character; Korean churches are usually led by men, in contrast to Chinese churches which more often have female leadership. For instance, of the 28 registered churches of Yanji, only three of which are Chinese congregations, all the Korean churches have a male pastor while all the Chinese churches have a female pastor. Also, Yanbian Korean church buildings are stylistically very similar to South Korean churches, with big spires surmounted by large red crosses. Yanbian Korean churches and house churches in China have been a matter of controversy for the Chinese government because of their links to South Korean churches. Many of the Korean house churches in China receive financial support and pastoral ordinations from South Korean churches, and some of them are effectively branches of South Korean churches. South Korean missionaries have major influence not only on Korean-Chinese churches but also the Han Chinese churches in mainland China.

Heterodox sects
In China there are also a variety of Christian sects based on biblical teachings that are considered by the government as "heterodox teachings" or cults, including the Eastern Lightning and the Shouters. They primarily operate in a form similar to the "house churches", small worship groups, outside of the state-sanctioned Three-Self Church, that meet in members' homes. One feature that some Christian sects with this label have in common is particular emphasis on the authority of a single leader, sometimes including claims to be Jesus. In the mid-1990s, Chinese government started to monitor these new religious movements, and prohibited them officially, so their activities soon turned underground.

Religious venues and practice
As of 2012 in China Catholicism has 6,300 churches, 116 active dioceses of which 97 under the Catholic Patriotic Church, 74 Chinese Patriotic bishops and 40 Roman Catholic unofficial bishops, 2,150 Chinese Patriotic priests and 1,500 Roman Catholic priests, 22 major and minor Chinese Patriotic seminaries and 10 Roman Catholic unofficial seminaries. In the same year, there are 53,000 Three-Self churches and meeting places and 21 Three-Self theological seminaries.

In 2010, The Church of Jesus Christ of Latter-day Saints in China revealed its on-going efforts to negotiate with authorities to regularize its activities in the country. The church has had expatriate members worshiping in China for a few decades previous to this, but with restrictions. On March 31, 2020, during its general conference, the church announced its intent to build a temple in Shanghai as a "modest multipurpose meetinghouse." When it opens it will operate by appointment only for Chinese members, excluding tourists.

Demographics and geography

Mainland China 

Although a number of factors—the vast Chinese population and the characteristic Chinese approach to religion among others—contribute to a difficulty to obtain empirical data on the number of Christians in China, a series of surveys have been conducted and published by different agencies. Government figures only count adult baptized members of government sanctioned churches. Thus they generally do not include un-baptized persons attending Christian groups, non-adult children of Christian believers or other persons under age 18 and they generally do not take into account unregistered Christian groups. There is often significant overlap between the membership of registered and unregistered Christian bodies, as a large number of people attend both registered and unregistered churches.

Official membership
 The Three-Self Church had a membership of 20 million people as of 2012.
 The Catholic Patriotic Church had a membership of 6 million people as of 2012.

Independent surveys
 : three surveys of religions in China conducted in those years by the Horizon Research Consultancy Group on a disproportionately urban and suburban sampling, found that Christians constituted between 2% and 4% of the total population.
 2007: two surveys were conducted that year to count the number of Christians in China. One of them was conducted by the Protestant missionary Werner Bürklin, founder of "China Partner", an international Christian organisation, and his team of 7,409 surveyors in every province and municipality of China. The other survey was conducted by professor Liu Zhongyu of the East China Normal University of Shanghai. The surveys were conducted independently and along different periods of time, but they reached the same results. According to the analyses, there were approximately 54 million Christians in China (~4% of the total population), of whom 39 million were Protestants and 14 million were Catholics.
 2008: a survey of religions conducted in that year by Yu Tao of the University of Oxford with a survey scheme led and supervised by the Center for Chinese Agricultural Policy (CCAP) and the Peking University, analysing the rural populations of the six provinces of Jiangsu, Sichuan, Shaanxi, Jilin, Hebei and Fujian, each representing different geographic and economic regions of China, found that Christians constituted approximately 4% of the population, of whom 3.54% were Protestants and 0.49% were Catholics.
 2008–2009: a household survey conducted by the Chinese Academy of Social Sciences (CASS) counted 23 million Protestants (independent and registered) in China.
 2010: the "Chinese Spiritual Life Survey" counted 33 million Christians (~2% of the total population), of whom 30 million Protestants and 3 million Catholics.
 2011: a survey conducted by the Baylor's Empirical Study of Values in China (ESVC) found 2.5% (~30 to 40 million) of the population of China self-identifying as Christian.
 2012: a survey conducted by the China Family Panel Studies (CFPS) institute, found Christians forming 2.4% of the population of Han China, or between 30 and 40 million people in absolute numbers. Of these, 1.9% were Protestants and 0.4% were Catholics.
 Surveys on religion in China conducted in the years 2006, 2008, 2010 and 2011 by the Chinese General Social Survey (CGSS) of the Renmin University found that people self-identifying as Christians were, respectively for each year, 2.1%, 2.2%, 2.1% and 2.6% of the total population.

Estimates
 2010: the Pew Forum on Religion & Public Life estimated over 67 million Christians in China, of which 35 million "independent" Protestants, 23 million Three-Self Protestants, 9 million Catholics and 20,000 Orthodox Christians.
 2014: scholars at a conference for the 60th anniversary of the Three-Self Church showed that China has about 23 million to 40 million Protestants, 1.7% to 2.9% of the total population. Each year, about 500,000 people are baptized as Protestants.

Protestants concentrate mainly in three regions: Henan, Anhui and Zhejiang. In these provinces the Christian population is in the millions, yet small in percentage. For instance, in Zhejiang 2.8% of the population is officially Protestant as of 1999, higher than the national average. In Wenzhou, a city of Zhejiang, about one million people (approximately 11%) are Christians, the highest concentration in one city. The Protestant population consists predominantly of illiterate or semi-illiterate people, elderly people and women. These characteristics are confirmed by the findings of the Yu Tao survey of 2008, which also found that Protestantism has the lowest proportion of believers who are at the same time members of the CCP in comparison to other religions, and by the China Family Panel Studies' survey of 2012.

The province of Hebei has a concentration of Catholics and is also home to the town of Donglu, site of an alleged Marian apparition and pilgrimage center. According to the Yu Tao survey of 2008, the Catholic population, though much smaller than that of the Protestants, is nevertheless younger, wealthier and better educated. The survey also found that Christianity overall has a higher proportion of ethnic minority believers than the other religions.

Controversy exists regarding the veracity of estimates published by some sources. For example, Gerda Wielander (2013) has claimed that estimates of the number of Christians in China that have been spread by Western media may have been highly inflated. For instance, according to Asia Harvest, a US non-profit organization and "inter-denominational Christian ministry", there were 105 millions Christians in China in 2011. The compiler of these figures, Paul Hattaway, indicates that his figures are his own estimate, based on more than 2,000 published sources such as Internet reports, journals, and books, as well as interviews with house church leaders. The study points out that "owing to the difficulties of conducting such a [study] in China today – not the least of which is the sheer size of the country – there is [in the study’s rough estimation] a margin of error of 20 percent." Citing one of the aforementioned surveys, Gerda Wielander says that the actual number of Christians is around 30 million. Similarly, missionary researcher Tony Lambert has highlighted that an estimate of "one hundred million Chinese Christians" was already being spread by American Christian media in 1983, and has been further exaggerated, through a chain of misquotations, in the 2000s. Christopher Marsh (2011) too has been critical of these overestimations. On 6 January 2015, David Ferguson published on the People's Daily the satirical news Merry Christmas, 100 million Chinese! criticising such type of journalism.

Demographics by province

Special administrations

Hong Kong

Christianity has been practiced in Hong Kong since 1841. As of 2010 there are 843,000 Christians in Hong Kong (11.8% of the total population).

Macau

As of 2010 approximately 5% of the population of Macau self-identifies as Christian, predominantly Catholic. Catholic missionaries were the first to arrive in Macau. In 1535, Portuguese traders obtained the rights to anchor ships in Macau's harbours and to carry out trading activities, though not the right to stay onshore. Around 1552–1553, they obtained temporary permission to erect storage sheds onshore, in order to dry out goods drenched by sea water; they soon built rudimentary stone houses around the area now called Nam Van. In 1576, Pope Gregory XIII established the Roman Catholic Diocese of Macau. In 1583, the Portuguese in Macau were permitted to form a Senate to handle various issues concerning their social and economic affairs under strict supervision of the Chinese authority, but there was no transfer of sovereignty. Macau prospered as a port but was the target of repeated failed attempts by the Dutch to conquer it in the 17th century. Cai Gao was the first mainland Chinese convert of the 19th-century Protestant missions. He was baptized by Robert Morrison at Macau in 1814.

Autonomous regions

Inner Mongolia

Tibet

The Qing government permitted Christian missionaries to enter and proselytize in Tibetan lands, in order to weaken the power of the Tibetan Buddhist lamas, who refused to give allegiance to the Chinese. The Tibetan lamas were alarmed by Catholic missionaries converting natives to Roman Catholicism. During the 1905 Tibetan Rebellion the Tibetan Buddhist Gelug Yellow Hat sect led a Tibetan revolt, with Tibetan men being led by lamas against Chinese officials, western Christian missionaries and native Christian converts. Wine making vineyards were left behind by them.

Xinjiang

Christianity is a minority religion in the Xinjiang region of the People's Republic of China. The dominant ethnic group, the Uygur, are predominantly Muslim and very few are known to be Christian.

In 1904, George Hunter with the China Inland Mission opened the first mission station for CIM in Xinjiang. But already in 1892, the Mission Covenant Church of Sweden started missions in the area around Kashgar, and later built mission stations, churches, hospitals and schools in Yarkant and Yengisar. In the 1930s there were several hundreds of Christians among this people, but because of persecution the churches were destroyed and the believers were scattered. The missionaries were forced to leave because of ethnic and factional battles during the Kumul Rebellion in the late 1930s.

Ningxia 
Though the Hui people live in nearly every part of China, they make up about 30% of the population of Ningxia. They are almost entirely Muslim and very few are Christian.

Guangxi 
Rapid church growth is reported to have taken place among the Zhuang people in the early 1990s. Though still predominantly Buddhist and animistic, the region of Guangxi was first visited in 1877 by Protestant missionary Edward Fishe of the China Inland Mission. He died the same year.

Art and media
Christian art is an important part of expressing faith for Christians, archeological sites containing early Christian art and architecture can be found throughout China. And are protected by the government as Chinese antiquities.

There is Christian media produced in China. The Christian magazine Tian Feng has a large reach, as do the academic journals Chinese Theological Review and Nanjing Theological Review. The Bible is translated into Chinese, such as the Chinese New Version, Chinese Union Version, Delegates' Version, Studium Biblicum Version, and Today's Chinese Version. Hymnals include Canaan Hymns and Chinese New Hymnal. Contemporary Christian music is available on streaming services like QQ Music.

Foreign Christian media is handled differently than other forms of foreign media, as the China Film Administration and National Radio and Television Administration sees it as a distinctive expression of Christian faith. The Publicity Department of the Chinese Communist Party instead relegates the task of releasing and translation of foreign Christian films and Christian literature to the State Administration for Religious Affairs, and the various Catholic Patriotic Association, China Christian Council, and Three-Self Patriotic Movement denominations. Christian television series such as Superbook, The Chosen, and Duck Dynasty are widely available in China, and are often times even dubbed into Chinese. Christian video games and interactive media are also accessible in Chinese, including the YouVersion Bible app and Superbook games.

Restrictions and international interest

In large cities with international links such as Beijing, foreign visitors have established Christian communities which meet in public establishments such as hotels and, sometimes, local churches. These fellowships, however, are typically restricted only to holders of non-Chinese passports.

American evangelist Billy Graham visited China in 1988 with his wife Ruth; it was a homecoming for her since she had been born in China to missionary parents L. Nelson Bell and his wife Virginia.

Since the 1980s, U.S. officials visiting China have on multiple occasions visited Chinese churches, including President George W. Bush, who attended one of Beijing's five officially recognized Protestant churches during a November 2005 Asia tour, and the Kuanjie Protestant Church in 2008. Secretary of State Condoleezza Rice attended Palm Sunday services in Beijing in 2005.

Government authorities limit proselytism, particularly by foreigners and unregistered religious groups, but permit proselytism in state-approved religious venues and private settings. During the 2008 Summer Olympics in Beijing, three American Christian protesters were deported from China after a demonstration at Tiananmen Square.

Pope Benedict XVI urged China to be open to Christianity, and said that he hoped the Olympic Games would offer an example of coexistence among people from different countries. Unregistered Roman Catholic clergy has faced political repression, in large part due to its avowed loyalty to the Vatican, which the Chinese government claims interferes in the country's internal affairs.

The Associated Press reported in 2018 that "Xi is waging the most severe systematic suppression of Christianity in the country since religious freedom was written into the Chinese constitution in 1982." This has involved "destroying crosses, burning bibles, shutting churches and ordering followers to sign papers renouncing their faith," actions taken against "so-called underground or house churches that defy government restrictions."

In April 2020, Chinese authorities visited Christian homes in Linfen and informed welfare recipients that their benefits would be stopped unless they removed all crosses and replaced any displays of Jesus with portraits of Chairman Mao Zedong and General Secretary Xi Jinping.

In June 2020, state officials oversaw the demolition of Sunzhuang Church in Henan province. Prior to the Church being demolished, one man was arrested and at least two women were injured.

See also
 Bibliography of Christianity in China
 Chinese Rites Controversy
 Christianity in Sichuan
 Denunciation Movement
 Historical Bibliography of the China Inland Mission
 Holy Cross Church, Wanzhou
 Timeline of Christian missions
 List of Protestant theological seminaries in the People's Republic of China
 Heterodox teachings (Chinese law)

Notes

References

Citations

Sources and further reading 

 
 
 
 Daniel H. Bays. Christianity in China: From the Eighteenth Century to the Present. Stanford University Press, 1999. 
 
 Joel Carpenter, Kevin R. den Dulk. Christianity in Chinese Public Life: Religion, Society, and the Rule of Law. Palgrave Pivot, 2014. 
  Excerpt
 
 
 
 
 Lee Shiu Keung. The Cross and the Lotus. Christian Study Centre on Chinese Religion and Culture, Hong Kong, 1971.
 Harrison, Henrietta, "'A Penny for the Little Chinese': The French Holy Childhood Association in China, 1843–1951." American Historical Review 113.1 (2008): 72–92. online
 Christopher Marsh. Religion and the State in Russia and China: Suppression, Survival, and Revival. Bloomsbury Academic, 2011. 
 James Miller. Chinese Religions in Contemporary Societies. ABC-CLIO, 2006. 
 Mungello, D. E. “Reinterpreting the History Of Christianity in China.” Historical Journal, 55#2 (2012), Pp. 533–552. online
 
 
 Handbook of Christianity in China, Volume One: 635-1800, (Handbook of Oriental Studies: Section 4 China), Edited by Nicolas Standaert, Brill: Leiden - Boston 2000, 964 pp., 
 Handbook of Christianity in China. Volume Two: 1800 - present. (Handbook of Oriental Studies: Section 4 China), Edited by R. G. Tiedemann, Brill: Leiden - Boston 2010, 1050 pp., 
 Thompson, Phyllis. The Reluctant Exodus. 1979. Singapore: OMF Books.
 Varg, Paul. Missionaries, Chinese, and Diplomats: The American Protestant Missionary Movement in China, 1890-1952 (1958) online
 Gerda Wielander. Christian Values in Communist China. Routledge, 2013.

External links

 
 Ricci Institute for Chinese-Western Cultural History, "The Ricci 21st Century Roundtable on the History of Christianity in China." Includes Bibliographies (an unannotated listing); biographies of people who played a role in the history of Christianity in China, web links.
 Biographical Dictionary of Chinese Christianity
 Timeline of Orthodoxy in China
 Preservation for the Documentation of Chinese Christianity 香港浸會大學圖書館 華人基督宗教文獻保存計劃 
 Documentation of Christianity in Hong Kong Database (香港基督教文獻數據庫)  Special Collections & Archives, Hong Kong Baptist University Library.
 Christianity Rare Books Database 基督教古籍數據庫  Special Collections & Archives, Hong Kong Baptist University Library.
 Christianity in Contemporary China Clippings 當代中國基督教發展剪報數據庫  Special Collections & Archives, Hong Kong Baptist University Library.
 Preservation for the Documentation of Chinese Christianity 香港浸會大學圖書館 華人基督宗教文獻保存計劃 
 China Through the Eyes of CIM Missionaries  Special Collections & Archives, Hong Kong Baptist University Library.
 Library Holdings on China Inland Mission  Special Collections & Archives, Hong Kong Baptist University Library.